Jeff Roland (born 16 June 1969 in Longeville-lès-Metz, Moselle, France) is a French artist and curator, known for his characteristic bold, colourful pieces fusing aspects of the raw style with contemporary literary and visual references. He is part of a group of artists known as neo-outsiders, a term coined by Dr. Melissa Westbrook, as a result of her research into the developments of outsider art in the 21st century, and the impact of the internet and social networks on contemporary art.

His work is part of the London Museum of Everything permanent collection, and the Barcelona Davis Museum collection. 
He has exhibited in several countries in Europe and was recently invited to show his work at the University of Nancy in France.
Roland is also curating for the city of Liverdun, and organizes shows at Chateau Corbin, specializing in outsider art.

Examples of work

Group exhibitions 
2020, Make Street Art Not War, Gallery WAWI, Paris.

References

External links
Official website

French contemporary artists
1969 births
Living people
Outsider art